Markus Schuler (born 1 August 1977) is a German former professional footballer who  usually played as left back.

Career
Born in Löffingen, Schuler began playing youth football at SV Feldberg and FC Löffingen. He played senior football with regional league clubs FC Neustadt and FV Donaueschingen before joining 2. Bundesliga side SC Fortuna Köln in 1998. After Fortuna were relegated in 2000, Schuler moved to 1. FSV Mainz 05 where manager Jürgen Klopp converted him from a winger to fullback. In 2002, Schuler joined newly promoted Hannover 96 where he would make his Bundesliga debut. In total, Schuler would play in 182 Bundesliga matches for Hannover and Arminia Bielefeld. In 2009, Schuler set the record for most Bundesliga matches played without scoring a goal. Schuler ended his playing career with Arminia, with the club suffering relegations to the 2. and 3. Bundesliga during his latter seasons.

References

External links
 
 

1977 births
Living people
People from Löffingen
Sportspeople from Freiburg (region)
German footballers
Association football fullbacks
1. FSV Mainz 05 players
Hannover 96 players
Arminia Bielefeld players
SC Fortuna Köln players
Bundesliga players
2. Bundesliga players
3. Liga players
Footballers from Baden-Württemberg